The Gaelic Senior Softball Doubles title is an inter-county Gaelic Athletic Association title contested by handball players from the Island of Ireland. The competition began in 1925 with T. Behan & J. Norton of Kilkenny winning the inaugural title.

Winning Counties

Information missing for 1999, 2000, 2001, 2002, 2003, 2004.
There was no competition between 1943 and 1945.

See also
 Gaelic Senior Hardball Singles
 Gaelic Senior Softball Singles

External links
Roll of Honour

Gaelic Athletic Association competitions
Gaelic handball